GURPS Lite is a 32-page introduction to the rules of the GURPS role-playing game based on the core rules in the GURPS 4e Basic Set (mainly Characters).

Contents
GURPS Lite includes basic character creation with advantages, disadvantages, skills and equipment, as well as some rules for playing.

People are allowed to make unmodified copies of the document and distribute as they please, as long as they don't charge any more than the cost of reproduction and don't incorporate it into another product.

Publication history
GURPS Lite was published in 1998 for GURPS third edition, and presents the game in a slim 32-page version, which allowed Steve Jackson Games the opportunity to produce standalone games which did not required the main rulebook. GURPS Discworld (1998) and GURPS WWII (2001) were the first books to include GURPS Lite in them, while later publications were labelled "Powered by GURPS" without including "GURPS" in the book title.
Unlike the later 4E version, the 3E original included the Magery advantage and rules for casting spells in various mana zones (it is only possible to cast Magic in High Mana settings without Magery). It also included the 14 basic spells of Create Fire, Daze, Detect Magic, Fireball, Foolishness, Haste, Ignite Fire, Lend Health, Lend Strength, Light, Minor Healing, Shape Fire, Shield and Sleep. These magic options were removed in the following years' 4E version of Lite.

The current version of GURPS Lite is available, free of charge, as a PDF from the Steve Jackson Games website.

Reception

References

External links
GURPS Lite 4th Edition

GURPS 3rd edition
GURPS 4th edition
Lite
Role-playing game supplements introduced in 2004